Illinois Route 63 (IL 63) was an east–west state highway in the Chicago metropolitan area. At its latest routing, it traveled from Illinois Route 72 (IL 72) in East Dundee to US 41 in Gurnee.

Route description
At its latest routing, IL 63 started to travel northeast from IL 72 in East Dundee. In under , it then intersected IL 25. Continuing northeast, it then briefly ran concurrently with IL 62 in Barrington Hills. Then, it ran concurrently with IL 59 all the way towards IL 22 in North Barrington. Meanwhile, they intersected IL 68, also in Barrington Hills, and then US 14 in Barrington. After intersecting IL 22, IL 63 turned eastward, running concurrently with IL 22 and intersecting with US 12 before leaving the concurrency. At this point, the route turned northeast along Midlothian Road. In Mundelein, IL 63 turned east via IL 176 before turning north via IL 21 in Libertyville. IL 21 then branched northwest to Grayslake as they intersected IL 137. IL 63 alone then met IL 120 at a parclo, I-94 at an incomplete diamond interchange, and IL 132 at an intersection before it intersected at US 41. At this point, the route ended there.

History
Initially, in 1929, IL 63 traveled from Chicago to East Dundee mostly via present-day IL 72 and then to Barrington via parts of present-day IL 68 and IL 59. In 1932, IL 63 was extended north along present-day IL 59 from US 12/IL 19 (now US 14) in Barrington to IL 22 in North Barrington. By 1934, US 14's eastern extension was established to travel along several state routes (including IL 63) in order to get to Chicago. In 1935, IL 63's Dundee–Chicago connection was removed in favor of US 14. By 1939, IL 63 was extended northeast roughly along present-day Illinois Route 22 (from North Barrington to Lake Zurich), Midlothian Road (from Lake Zurich to Mundelein), Illinois Route 176 (from Mundelein to Libertyville), and Illinois Route 21 (from Libertyville to Gurnee). This resulted in the decommissioning of Illinois Route 172 between US 45 (now IL 137) in Libertyville to IL 68 (now US 41) in Gurnee. In 1973, without any significant changes to the routing since 1939, the routing was removed.

Major intersections

See also

References

External links 
Illinois Highways Page - Routes 61 through 80

063
Transportation in Kane County, Illinois
Transportation in Cook County, Illinois
Transportation in DuPage County, Illinois
U.S. Route 14